Aliliú na Gamhna is an Irish folk song. It describes what it was like for a farmer's daughter as she spent time with her cows. According to an Irish song book,it is related to Na Gamhna Geala,where the woman laments her cows after getting married. It's possible that the song may have come about by the early 17th century.

References

Irish folk songs